Antony Darnborough (6 October 1913 – 24 September 2000) was a British film producer and director.

Select Credits
Quartet (1948)
Traveller's Joy (1949)
Boys in Brown (1949)
The Astonished Heart (1950)
So Long at the Fair (1950)
Trio (1950)
Encore (1951)
To Paris with Love (1954)
The Baby and the Battleship (1956)

References

External links

Antony Darnborough at BFI
Obituary at The Guardian
Obituary at The Telegraph

British film producers
1913 births
2000 deaths
British film directors
20th-century British businesspeople